Cyclin-L1 is a protein that in humans is encoded by the CCNL1 gene.

References

External links

Further reading

Cell cycle regulators